Suzanne Pleshette Is Maggie Briggs is an American sitcom that aired on CBS from March 4 to April 15, 1984.

Premise
Maggie Briggs is a reporter at The New York Examiner who is demoted from working on feature stories to writing human interest pieces.

Cast
Suzanne Pleshette as Maggie Briggs
Kenneth McMillan as Walter Holden
Shera Danese as Connie Piscipoli
Stephen Lee as Sherman Milslagle
John Getz as Geoff Bennett
Alison La Placa as Melanie Bitterman
Roger Bowen as Danny Bauer
Michelle Nicastro as Diane Barstow

Ratings

Episodes

References

External links

TV.com
TV Guide

1984 American television series debuts
1984 American television series endings
1980s American sitcoms
1980s American workplace comedy television series
CBS original programming
English-language television shows
Briggs, Maggie
Television series about journalism
Television series by Warner Bros. Television Studios
Television shows set in New York City
Television series by Lorimar Television